On 18 September 1961, a DC-6 passenger aircraft of Transair Sweden, operating for the United Nations, crashed near Ndola, Northern Rhodesia (present-day Zambia). The crash resulted in the deaths of all people on board, including Dag Hammarskjöld, the second Secretary-General of the United Nations, and 15 others. Hammarskjöld had been en route to cease-fire negotiations with Moïse Tshombe during the Congo Crisis. Three official inquiries failed to determine conclusively the cause of the crash, which set off a succession crisis at the United Nations.

Incident

In September 1961, during the Congo Crisis, Hammarskjöld learned about fighting between "non-combatant" UN forces and Katangese troops of Moise Tshombe. On 18 September, Hammarskjöld was en route to negotiate a cease-fire when the aircraft he was flying in crashed near Ndola, Northern Rhodesia (now Zambia). Hammarskjöld and fifteen others perished in the crash. The crash set off a succession crisis at the United Nations, as Hammarskjöld's death required the Security Council to vote on a successor.

Aircraft and crew
The aircraft involved in this accident was a Douglas DC-6B, c/n 43559/251, registered in Sweden as SE-BDY, first flown in 1952 and powered by four Pratt & Whitney R-2800 18-cylinder radial piston engines. It was flown by Captain Per Hallonquist (35); First Officer Lars Litton (29); and Flight Engineer Nils Göran Wilhelmsson.

UN special report
A special report issued by the United Nations following the crash stated that a bright flash in the sky was seen at approximately 01:00. According to the UN special report, it was this information that resulted in the initiation of search and rescue operations. Initial indications that the crash might not have been an accident led to multiple official inquiries and persistent speculation that the secretary-general was assassinated.

Official inquiry

Following the death of Hammarskjöld, there were three inquiries into the circumstances that led to the crash: the Rhodesian Board of Investigation, the Rhodesian Commission of Inquiry, and the United Nations Commission of Investigation.

The Rhodesian Board of Investigation looked into the matter between 19 September 1961 and 2 November 1961 under the command of Lt. Colonel M.C.B. Barber. The Rhodesian Commission of Inquiry, under the chairmanship of Sir John Clayden, held hearings from 16–29 January 1962 without United Nations oversight. The subsequent United Nations Commission of Investigation held a series of hearings in 1962 and in part depended upon the testimony from the previous Rhodesian inquiries. Five "eminent persons" were assigned by the new secretary-general to the UN Commission. The members of the commission unanimously elected Nepalese diplomat Rishikesh Shaha to head an inquiry.

The three official inquiries failed to determine conclusively the cause of the crash that led to the death of Hammarskjöld. The Rhodesian Board of Investigation sent 180 men to search a six-square-kilometer area of the last sector of the aircraft's flight path, looking for evidence as to the cause of the crash. No evidence of a bomb, surface-to-air missile, or hijacking was found. The official report stated that two of the dead Swedish bodyguards had suffered multiple bullet wounds. Medical examination, performed by the initial Rhodesian Board of Investigation and reported in the UN official report, indicated that the wounds were superficial, and that the bullets showed no signs of rifling. They concluded that cartridges had exploded in the fire in proximity to the bodyguards. No evidence of foul play was found in the wreckage of the aircraft. The Rhodesian Board concluded that the pilot flew too low and struck trees, thereby bringing the aircraft to the ground.

Previous accounts of a bright flash in the sky were dismissed as occurring too late in the evening to have caused the crash. The UN report speculated that these flashes may have been caused by secondary explosions after the crash. Sergeant Harold Julien, who initially survived the crash but died five days later, indicated that there was a series of explosions that preceded the crash. The official inquiry found that the statements of witnesses who talked with Julien before he died in hospital five days after the crash were inconsistent.

The report states that there were numerous delays that violated established search and rescue procedures. There were three separate delays: the first delayed the initial alarm of a possible plane in trouble; the second delayed the "distress" alarm, which indicates that communications with surrounding airports indicate that a missing plane has not landed elsewhere; the third delayed the eventual search and rescue operation and the discovery of the plane wreckage, just kilometres/miles away. The medical examiner's report was inconclusive; one report said that Hammarskjöld had died on impact; another stated that Hammarskjöld might have survived had rescue operations not been delayed. The report also said that the chances of Sgt. Julien surviving the crash would have been "infinitely" better if the rescue operations had been hastened.

On 16 March 2015, UN Secretary-General Ban Ki-moon appointed members to an independent panel of experts to examine new information related to the tragedy. The three-member panel was led by Mohamed Chande Othman, the Chief Justice of Tanzania. The other two members were Kerryn Macaulay (Australia's representative to ICAO) and Henrik Larsen (a ballistics expert from the Danish National Police). The report was handed over to the secretary-general on 12 June 2015. The panel's 99-page report, released 6 July 2015, assigned "moderate" value to nine new eyewitness accounts and transcripts of radio transmissions. Those accounts suggested that Hammarskjöld's plane was already on fire as it landed and that other jet aircraft and intelligence agents were nearby.

Alternative theories
Despite the multiple official inquiries that failed to find evidence of assassination or other forms of foul play, several individuals have continued to advance a theory of the crash being deliberately caused by hostile interests. At the time of Hammarskjöld's death, the Central Intelligence Agency and other Western agencies were actively involved in the political situation in the Congo, which culminated in Belgian and US support for the secession of Katanga and the assassination of former prime minister Patrice Lumumba. The Belgian government had a vested interest in maintaining their control over much of the country's copper industry during the Congolese transition from colonial rule to independence. Concerns about the nationalisation of the copper industry could have provided a financial incentive to remove either Lumumba or Hammarskjöld.

The official inquiry has come under scrutiny and criticism from historians, who point to a number of conclusions made which they claim were done to steer focus away from the assassination angle. The official report dismissed a number of pieces of evidence that would have supported the view that Hammarskjöld was assassinated. Some of these dismissals have been criticized, such as the conclusion that bullet wounds could have been caused by bullets exploding in a fire. Expert tests have questioned this conclusion, arguing that exploding bullets could not break the surface of the skin. Major C. F. Westell, a ballistics authority, said, "I can certainly describe as sheer nonsense the statement that cartridges of machine guns or pistols detonated in a fire can penetrate a human body." He based his statement on a large scale experiment that had been done to determine if military fire brigades would be in danger working near munitions depots. Other experts conducted and filmed tests showing that bullets heated to the point of explosion did not achieve sufficient velocity to penetrate their box container.

On 19 August 1998, Archbishop Desmond Tutu, chairman of South Africa's Truth and Reconciliation Commission (TRC), stated that recently uncovered letters had implicated MI5, the CIA, and then South African intelligence services in the crash. One TRC letter said that a bomb in the aircraft's wheel bay was set to detonate when the wheels came down for a landing. Tutu said that they were unable to investigate the truth of the letters or the allegations that South African or Western intelligence agencies played a role in the crash. The British Foreign Office suggested that they may have been created as Soviet misinformation or disinformation.

On 29 July 2005, Norwegian Army Major general Bjørn Egge gave an interview to the newspaper Aftenposten on the events surrounding Hammarskjöld's death. According to Egge, who had been the first UN officer to see the body, Hammarskjöld had a hole in his forehead, and this hole was subsequently airbrushed from photos taken of the body. It appeared to Egge that Hammarskjöld had been thrown from the plane, and grass and leaves in his hands might indicate that he survived the crash – and that he had tried to scramble away from the wreckage. Egge did not officially claim that the wound was a gunshot wound.

In his speech to the 64th session of the UN General Assembly on 23 September 2009, Colonel Gaddafi called upon the Libyan president of UNGA, Ali Treki, to institute a UN investigation into the deaths of Congolese prime minister, Patrice Lumumba, who was overthrown in 1960 and murdered the following year, and of Hammarskjöld in 1961.

According to a dozen witnesses interviewed by Swedish aid worker Göran Björkdahl in the 2000s, Hammarskjöld's plane was shot down by another aircraft. Björkdahl also reviewed previously unavailable archive documents and internal UN communications. He believes that there was an intentional shoot down for the benefit of mining companies like Union Minière. A US intelligence officer who was stationed at an electronic surveillance station in Cyprus stated that he heard a cockpit recording from Ndola. In the cockpit recording a pilot talks of closing in on the DC-6 in which Hammarskjöld was traveling, guns are heard firing, and then the words "I've hit it".

In 2011, the study by Susan Williams Who Killed Hammarskjold?, a University of London scholar of decolonisation in Africa outlined several serious doubts about the accidental character of the plane crash in 1961. It led to the formation of independent, unofficial commission of inquiry in 2012 to provide an opinion on whether there was new evidence that would justify the UN re-opening its 1962 inquiry – the commission was headed by the British jurist Stephen Sedley. The Sedley commission's report was presented on 9 September 2013, at the Peace Palace in The Hague. It recommended that the UN re-open its inquiry "pursuant to General Assembly resolution 1759 (XVII) of 26 October 1962". Its findings formed the basis of the constitution of a panel of experts, and in March 2015 the appointment of Eminent Person Mohamed Chande Othman at the UN to support the ongoing Hammarskjöld Commission.

In April 2014, the Guardian published evidence implicating Jan van Risseghem, a military pilot who served with the RAF during World War II, later with the Belgian Air Force, and who became known as the pilot of Moise Tshombe in Katanga. Southall recalled the pilot saying: "I see a transport plane coming low. All the lights are on. I'm going down to make a run on it. Yes, it is the Transair DC-6. It's the plane," adding that his voice was "cool and professional". Then he heard the sound of gunfire and the pilot exclaiming: "I've hit it. There are flames! It's going down. It's crashing!" Based on aircraft registration and availability with the Katangese Air Force, registration KAT-93, a Fouga CM.170 Magister would be the most likely aircraft used and the website Belgian Wings claims that van Risseghem piloted the Magisters for the KAF in 1961. A further article was published by The Guardian in January 2019, repeating the allegations against van Risseghem and citing further evidence uncovered by the makers of the documentary Cold Case Hammarskjöld, including refutations of his alibi that he was not flying at the time of the crash.

In December 2018, the German freelance historian Torben Gülstorff published an article in the Lobster magazine, arguing that a German Dornier DO-28A may have been used for the attack on Hammarskjöld's DC-6. The plane was delivered to Katanga by end of August 1961 and would have been technically capable of accomplishing such an assault.

Memorial 

The Dag Hammarskjöld Crash Site Memorial is under consideration for inclusion as a UNESCO World Heritage Site. A press release issued by the Prime Minister of the Republic of the Congo stated that, "... in order to pay a tribute to this great man, now vanished from the scene, and to his colleagues, all of whom have fallen victim to the shameless intrigues of the great financial Powers of the West... the Government has decided to proclaim Tuesday, 19 September 1961, a day of national mourning."

In media
 The accident and subsequent investigation were featured in the fifteenth season and fifth episode of the documentary series Mayday (also known as Air Crash Investigation) titled "Deadly Mission", first broadcast in February 2016.
 In the 2016 film The Siege of Jadotville, Hammarskjöld's plane is intercepted by an F-4 Phantom II aircraft, and it is implied that Katangese Prime Minister Moise Tshombe ordered it done, however the film ultimately leaves it ambiguous as Hammarskjöld's plane is never shown actually being shot down, only implied. The film is incorrect, however, in depicting the plane crash as taking place during the six-day attack by Katangese forces against Irish Army peacekeepers led by Commandant Pat Quinlan. In reality, Hammarskjöld died the day after the besieged Irish contingent had surrendered.
 The 2019 film Cold Case Hammarskjöld details and dramatizes the investigation into Hammarskjöld's alleged assassination by Danish film director Mads Brügger and Swedish private investigator Göran Björkdahl. The film concludes that Hammarskjöld's plane was shot down by a Belgian mercenary, probably acting as part of a plot with involvement from the CIA, MI6, and a mysterious South African white supremacist paramilitary organization, SAIMR.

Notes

References

External links

 Dag Hammarskjöld archives on UN Archives website.
 18 September 1961 UN Secretary-General Dag Hammarskjöld is killed and BBC

Aviation accidents and incidents in Zambia
Congo Crisis
Conspiracy theories involving aviation incidents
Aviation accidents and incidents in 1961
Accidents and incidents involving the Douglas DC-6
Death conspiracy theories
September 1961 events in Africa
Aviation accident investigations with disputed causes